George Merrill (born 10 January 1956) is an American songwriter whose work mostly dates from the mid- to late 1980s.

He co-wrote "How Will I Know", which was a hit for Whitney Houston in 1986, as well as Houston's 1987 hit "I Wanna Dance with Somebody (Who Loves Me)".

From the mid- to late 1980s to the present day, Merrill has been one half of vocal duo Boy Meets Girl, who are best remembered for the late-1988 hit "Waiting for a Star to Fall". He wrote the song and had initially offered it to Houston and Belinda Carlisle, but they both rejected it (though Carlisle did do a demo recording) and Merrill decided to sing it himself and feature it on the next Boy Meets Girl album.

Merrill was married to Shannon Rubicam (his partner in Boy Meets Girl) from the mid-1980s until they divorced in 2000. They have one daughter, Hilary; she can be seen as the little blond girl in her parents' video of "Waiting for a Star to Fall". Despite their divorce they have continued working together for various music projects.

References

1956 births
Living people
American male pop singers
American male songwriters
Boy Meets Girl members
20th-century American singers
21st-century American singers
20th-century American male singers
21st-century American male singers